Rhinogobio cylindricus is a species of cyprinid fish. It is endemic to the middle and upper reaches of the Yangtze in China.

References

cylindricus
Cyprinid fish of Asia
Freshwater fish of China
Endemic fauna of China
Fish described in 1888
Taxa named by Albert Günther